Deshpande Startups, formerly known as the Entrepreneur in Residence (EIR) program, is a business incubator based in Hubli, Karnataka, India. The incubation centre was launched by Deshpande Foundation in 2008 to provide resources to entrepreneurs located outside of the main metropolises so that they are able to develop and accelerate need-based solutions for the semi and rural populations in India.

History

In 2008, Deshpande Foundation launched Deshpande Startups, a business incubator, with the purpose to nurture the entrepreneurial ecosystem within India. 

In July 2018, Sandbox Startups inaugurated a new incubation centre located in hubballi. This new centre was created with the purpose to provide physical space for entrepreneurs to develop their business ideas, as well as play a role in building and fostering the entrepreneurial ecosystem in non-metro communities. The workspace is equipped with facilities, such as the Makers Lab and ESDM Cluster,  that able entrepreneurs to build their prototypes and test the feasibility of their ideas under one roof. 

The living laboratory has expanded to two states, Karnataka and Telangana, and is now operating three incubation centres located in hubballi and belagavi

Successful companies from Deshpnade Startups
 NextDrop Smart Water Systems Pvt. Ltd

References 

Business incubators of India
2008 establishments in Karnataka
Economy of Karnataka
Organisations based in Karnataka